Dick Wilson (November 19, 1933 – December 31, 2008) was an American wrestler. He competed at the 1956 Summer Olympics, the 1960 Summer Olympics and the 1964 Summer Olympics. In 2016, Wilson was inducted into the National Wrestling Hall of Fame as a Distinguished Member.

References

1933 births
2008 deaths
American male sport wrestlers
Olympic wrestlers of the United States
Wrestlers at the 1956 Summer Olympics
Wrestlers at the 1960 Summer Olympics
Wrestlers at the 1964 Summer Olympics
People from Washington, Pennsylvania
Pan American Games medalists in wrestling
Pan American Games gold medalists for the United States
Wrestlers at the 1959 Pan American Games